Andy Hunter (11 October 1883 – 23 August 1933) was an Irish footballer who played as a forward

Club career
Hunter joined Distillery in 1904 having played youth football for Woodvale and Linfield Swifts, as well as the Royal Army Medical Corps . Hunter was part of the side that won the Irish Cup in 1905 and the Irish League in 1905–06, before joining Belfast Celtic F.C. in May 1907. After one season with Celtic, Hunter joined Glentoran for a season, before signing for The Wednesday in March 1909. Hunter scored his first goal for the English side in the 2–1 victory over Liverpool on 10 April 1909.

Hunter returned for a loan spell at Distillery in the winter of 1909, returning to The Wednesday in the spring of 1910, where he scored two further goals in a 2–1 win against Blackburn Rovers. He would leave Wednesday in the summer of 1910, rejoining Glentoran where he won the County Antrim Shield and Belfast Charity Cup in 1911, before retiring in 1912.

Hunter scored 30 goals in 108 appearances for Distillery across his spells with the club and 25 goals in 63 appearances during both periods with Glentoran.

International career
Hunter made his Ireland debut against Wales during the 1905-06 British Home Championship, and made 8 international appearances, his only goal coming in his final international against Wales in 1909.

References

Irish association footballers (before 1923)
NIFL Premiership players
Association football forwards
Northern Ireland amateur international footballers
Pre-1950 IFA international footballers
1883 births
1933 deaths
Lisburn Distillery F.C. players
Sheffield Wednesday F.C. players
Glentoran F.C. players